Røyken is a district and village (bygd) and a former municipality in Buskerud in Viken County, Norway. In 2020 Røyken was merged with the municipalities of Hurum and Asker to form the new Asker Municipality (informally called "Greater Asker") located in the newly formed Viken county. The administrative centre of the municipality is the village of Midtbygda.  The parish of Røken was established as a municipality on 1 January 1838 (see formannskapsdistrikt).

Oslo ATCC, the Area Control Center for the controlled airspace above Østlandet is located here.

General information

Name
The municipality (originally the parish) is named after the old Røyken farm (Norse Raukvin), since the first church was built there. The first element is raukr which means "pile, stack; mountain" and the last element is vin which means "meadow" or "pasture".

Coat-of-arms
The coat-of-arms is from modern times.  They were granted on 15 December 1967.  The figure shows a yellow fire on a blue background.  It was chosen as a semi-canting symbol to represent smoke (which cannot be depicted in heraldry). The background for the motif is a common misunderstanding of the name as røyken the definite form of røyk meaning "smoke".

Geography
Røyken is located south of Lier and Asker, on the northern part of the Hurum peninsula north of Hurum municipality. It lies between Oslofjord and Drammensfjord. It is connected to the eastern side of the Oslofjord via Hurum municipality and the Oslofjord Tunnel.

The district includes large amounts of residential zones with beautiful sights of the sea. The administration is situated in the village of Midtbygda. The main population centers are the villages of Hyggen, Hallenskog, Midtbygda, Nærsnes, Røyken, Slemmestad, Spikkestad, and Åros. Many people live in the northern part of Bødalen and its vicinities, which is a continuous residential area that continues throughout Asker and Bærum to Oslo.

Municipality Reform
As part of the municipality reform process instigated by Minister of Local Government Jan Tore Sanner the municipalities of Asker, Hurum and Røyken evaluated if they should merge into a new common municipality during the first half of 2016. A tentative agreement was reached and on 16 June 2016 the Municipal Council of Røyken approved the merger with Asker and Hurum with 24 votes for and 3 against. The merger date was 1 January 2020 and the chosen name was Asker.

Notable people 
 Einar Jansen (1893 in Røyken – 1960) a Norwegian historian, genealogist and archivist 
 Jonas Fjeldstad (1894 in Røyken – 1985) a prize-winning oceanographer and mathematician
 Ove Bang (1895 in Røyken – 1942) a Norwegian architect, advocated functionalism in architecture
 Eberhart Jensen (1922 in Røyken – 2003) a Norwegian astrophysicist 
 Bjørge Lillelien (1927 in Slemmestad – 1987) a sports journalist and commentator for NRK 
 Kate Gulbrandsen (born 1965 in Slemmestad) one of Norway's former Eurovision singers
 Melissa Wiik (born 1985 in Slemmestad) a footballer with 200 club caps and 63 for Norway women

Gallery

References

External links

Municipal fact sheet from Statistics Norway

 
Municipalities of Buskerud
Villages in Buskerud